Gruben is a village in the municipality of Rana in Nordland county, Norway. Gruben sits on the southern shore of the river Ranelva and it is a southeastern suburb of the town of Mo i Rana. European route E12 originally passed through of the village, but since 1995 it has passed north of the village.

Gruben has four daycare centres, a school with secondary classes, two grocery stores, one nursing home care, two petrol stations and a lot of local businesses. Gruben Church is a parish church that was built in 1965 with about 550 seats.

References

Rana, Norway
Villages in Nordland